Werribee Secondary College (abbreviated as WSC) is a government high school in Werribee, a suburb of Melbourne, Victoria, Australia. The College is operated by the Victorian Department of Education.

Established in 1956, the College enrolled, in 2019, approximately 1,500 students from Year 7 to Year 12, of whom less than one percent identified as Indigenous Australians and 65 percent were from a language background other than English. Since 2000, Werribee Secondary College has experienced heavy demand for enrolments at Year 7 and at other levels.  To manage this, a ceiling was placed on the total school enrolment.

The college established an International Students Program in 2000 and attracts international students. The college has relationships with schools in USA, Spain and Japan. The college was accredited with the Council of International Schools (CIS) in 2006. Since 2013 the College was the first Victorian Government school to offer students the choice of the International Baccalaureate Diploma Programme alongside the Victorian Certificate of Education (VCE) or VCAL.  Students will select the senior programme (VCE, VCAL or IB) which best suits their individual interests and learning styles.

History
In 1997 the gifted education "Select Entry Accelerated Learning" Program or SEAL was introduced. SEAL is the only Department of Education accredited program in the City of Wyndham. The program is for year 7 to year 10.

In May 2004 the college was hit by a massive fire that destroyed the school's technology and textiles wing. It caused up to A$2 million damage, including the destruction of students' VCE assignments. Junior students had up to 12 days off school while portable classrooms were brought to the school site.

In August 2006 Werribee Secondary College received accreditation from the Council of International Schools.

In 2011 Werribee Secondary College became the first state school in Victoria to offer the International Baccalaureate Diploma program (it had previously only been available at fifteen private schools).

In December 2009 it was reported that four teachers from the school were taking legal action for psychological damage resulting from bullying and harassment by colleagues. Earlier in the same year, another staff member was awarded up to $140,000 in compensation as a result of his treatment by the school.
Another case against the school was before the Supreme Court in October 2013.

In 2014, a case brought by Peter Doulis against the Department resulted in Doulis being awarded damages and costs in excess of $1.2 million. It was also revealed by The Age in February 2015 that the Principal of the College received a public service medal for his services to public education despite the school being involved in another case whereby a female staff member received a "six figure damages payout for psychological injuries" which resulted from her treatment by the school.

Campus
Following the 2004 fire, over 70% of classes were situated in portable classrooms. In 2005, the college received funding from the Victorian Department of Education for an extension (called the Shirley Cameron Centre) of the College's "Eca-Centre" (gymnasium and auditorium) which contained two food technology classrooms, two health classrooms, a canteen and a toilet block as well as new Music Centre. The construction of a new art and technology wing (called the Raymond Findlay Centre) was completed in 2007. A new school library, staff resource centre, administration wing as well as an extension to current school auditorium were completed in 2009.

The college has access to two playing ovals; College Oval and Soldier's Reserve. College Oval is owned and maintained by the college and is used for recreational purposes. Soldier's Reserve is maintained by Wyndham City Council and is used for sporting purposes including interschool cricket, Australian rules football, rugby and soccer. The college's gymnasium located next to the Shirley Cameron Centre is used for basketball, netball and volleyball. Basketball courts are located adjacent to the College Oval.

In early 2011 the school built a Language Centre and Science centre under government funding. The building holds around 12 rooms, four Science classrooms, an ICT office, one Science preparation room, and office at ground level. On the second floor there are 5 LOTE rooms and one LOTE office. The Language building and facilities are frequently used for exchange students from sister schools in China, Japan, Singapore and the USA.

Education

Mainstream

Junior School (Years 7 and 8)
Students undertake a program based on the Australian Curriculum, which involving a core curriculum in Years 7 and 8.  The Year 7 curriculum includes studies in ‘GEMS' Program (Geography and Mankind in Society – English, Geography, History).  The program has been well established at Year 7 so to assist with the transition from Primary School. Junior School, with students studying all eight key learning areas.  All students study one language other than English, and select either Chinese, Italian, Japanese or Spanish.

Middle School (Years 9 and 10)
All students undertake studies in the following subjects: English, Mathematics, Science, Humanities (History, Geography and Economics) Information and Communications Technology, Health and Physical Education.  The curriculum is based on the Australian Curriculum. Elective studies may be chosen from; The Arts- Technology (& Information Technology at Year 10)- Languages, either Chinese, Italian, Japanese or Spanish. Students in the Select Entry and High Achieving Classes at Year 10 are able to undertake VCE studies whilst in Year 10.

Senior School (Years 11 and 12)
The College operates four types of programs in the Senior School:
Victorian Certificate of Education (VCE) – the College offers a wide selection of studies within the VCE. 
International Baccalaureate Diploma Program (IBDP) – the College offers IBDP as an alternative to VCE. 
Vocational Education and Training (VET) units – these units are offered to students by the College and across a cluster of local schools. 
Victorian Certificate of Applied Learning (VCAL) – the College offers this program to a limited number of students

SELP program
The college holds a SEAL (Select Entry Accelerated Learning) accreditation with the Academy of Accredited SEAL schools (TAASS), a for profit group which has taken over such accreditation since the department of education dropped SEAL schools programs in 2014. The college is the only school in Wyndham to hold this program.  The program starts in Year 7 and runs to 10. At year 7 and 8 there are 3 classes; 1 SELP IB class(not affiliated with the schools IB program as the school is only registered and accredited to provide the IB Diploma program) and 2 SELP classes. Consecutive years currently only run with two classes at each year level. During Year 11 and Year 12 where there is only one class. Students in the SELP program must have at least 90% attendance. It is also required for SELP students to have an average of 70% in all of their core subjects.

The college was granted permission to hold the IB Diploma program in 2009, and began offering the program in 2013.

Co-curricular activities

The College provides a significant variety of co-curricular activities and experiences in which students may become involved. A growing number of students are undertaking the Duke of Edinburgh Award, first offered at Werribee Secondary College in 2003. Students have completed the award to bronze, silver and gold levels. The College fields a number of inter-school debating teams, which have achieved excellent results in competitions. Student may receive public speaking training and participate in Rotary Public Speaking Competitions and the Lions Youth of the Year Award. The College has developed a number of bands, choirs and ensembles which perform at Presentation Evening and at concerts held each term and at special events. Bands include Jazz, Rock, Big Band and Concert Band. The college produces four major concerts each year and perform at public events throughout Wyndham.  Students aspire to leadership positions within the Music Program. The College has an active Drama Club which provides opportunities for students to experience all elements of theatrical production. The program is administered with the support of student Drama Leaders. The Year 10 Formal is organised by a committee of Year 10 students working with the Year 10 Coordinator. The College organises the annual Valedictory Dinner for graduating Year 12 students. Students may participate in hosting students from sister-schools in Singapore, China and Japan. A Reading Club operates for all students and a special Reading Club is offered to students studying English as an Additional Language. Students are encouraged to represent the College in a number of inter-school sports including Swimming, Athletics, Cross Country, Australian Football, Basketball, Netball, Soccer and Table Tennis. The College also has a chess club which has many participants and students are able to compete for the College against students from other schools.

Other
As part of an "Internationally accredited school", the college invites students each year for a two-week visit from overseas. Students from the college may also get the chance for a visit to other schools and places overseas.

The college music program includes a compulsory Year 7&8 SEAL band and string ensembles, Junior Band, Senior Band, Guitar Ensemble, String Ensemble and other small group performances. Achievements include performing at Melbourne's Hamer Hall.

The college since July 2009 has been granted permission to hold IB program, and the college began the program in 2013 with an estimate of 25 students who will undertake the course.

Houses
The college has newly added eight houses. Houses are divided into home groups as an attempt by the college to encourage student bonding. The houses are named after people who have "Lived Worthily"... the College motto. The houses are:

Alumni
Aisha Dee – Chasing Life actress
Merv Hughes – former Australian test cricketer
Rebecca Maddern – Channel Seven reporter
Shanina Shaik – Australian model
Mike Sheahan – Herald Sun Australian rules football writer

See also 

 List of government schools in Victoria

References

External links
 Werribee Secondary College website
 http://www.truelocal.com.au/business/werribee-secondary-college/werribee
 http://www.wyndhamweekly.com.au/story/1516545/werribee-secondary-college-gead-red-shield-support/
 Werribee Secondary College Bus Information Public Transport Victoria.

Public high schools in Melbourne
Educational institutions established in 1956
International Baccalaureate schools in Australia
Schools in Wyndham
1956 establishments in Australia
Werribee, Victoria